Philistis, the wife of Hieron II, was a queen of ancient Syracuse, known only from her coins, which are numerous, and of fine workmanship, and from the occurrence of her name (bearing the title of queen, as it does also on her coins) in an inscription in large letters on the great theatre of Syracuse. The circumstance that it is here associated with that of Nereis, the wife of Gelon II, as well as the style and fabric of the coins, which closely resemble those of Hieron II and his son, leads to the conclusion that these were struck during the long reign of Hieron II. The most probable conjecture is that Philistis was the wife of Hieron himself.

References
IG XIV 3  basilissas Philistidos.  IGASMG II 37  
Coins of Ancient Sicily By George Francis Hill Page 190  (2009)
R. Rochette, Memoires de Numismaiique et d Antiquite, pp. 63–78 
Visconti, Iconogr. Grecque, vol. ii. pp. 21–25.
The Coin Collector's Manual, Or Guide To Numismatic Student In The Formation Of A Cabinet Of Coins Page 110 by Henry Noel Humphreys (1853)

3rd-century BC Syracusans
Ancient Greek queens consort